Scoliographa acanthis is a moth of the family Tortricidae first described by Edward Meyrick in 1920. It is found in India and Sri Lanka.

Its larval food plant is Justicia gendarussa, where the caterpillar feeds on the stem and leaves.

References

Moths of Asia
Moths described in 1920